The Corps Bavaria of Munich is a German Student Corps located in the City of Munich. The Fraternity is a founding member of the umbrella organisation "Kösener Senioren Convent" and unites current students of all Universities in Munich and Alumnus. As a German Corps it still practices the Mensur, the Members are wearing an academic ribbon as a sign of belonging. The fellows of the Corps are called "Bavarians from Munich", because in the early years only people from Bavaria were able to affiliate.

Couleur 
Bavaria is known for their white-blue-white ribbon on golden ground. On special occasions the Bavarians also wear a white student Cap. New members (Füchse) have a ribbon with the colours white-blue on golden ground.

History

Landshut 
The Corps was founded on 30 November 1806 at the University of Landshut, which today is the Ludwig Maximilan University of Munich. Founding President was Joseph Count of Armansperg. He later became Bavarian Minister vor inner-, outer-, and financial affairs. As a minister for inner affairs he guaranteed the moving of the Corps from Landshut to Munich in 1827. In 1832 Armansperg became Archchancellor of the Kingdom of Greece.

Another founding member was Carl Joseph Anton Mittermaier, one of the best known Law Professors in the 19th Century. He was president of the Universities of Heidelberg and Landshut and later became President of the first democratic Parliament in Germany in 1848.

Munich 
In July 1848 the President of the Corps Anton Baron of Lobkowitz was a co-founder of the Umbrella Organisation, KSCV. Corps Bavaria became a full member in 1862 and still is today.

During the 19th Century many Noblemen, Jurists and Medics were fellows of the Corps. As the Bavarian Corps in Munich many members served the royal family of Bavaria, the Wittelsbachers. Only two examples are Emil Knight of Schauß (he protected the royal treasure) and Theodor Imperal Earl Basselet of la Rosée (Educator of the Royal Princes Ludwig and Otto).

In the time of National Socialism Corps Bavaria was forbidden as one of the first Corps, because they refused to work together with the National Socialistic Party. In 1935 they got forced to sell their own house, next to the University, to the politician Adolf Wagner. One Alumnus, namely Eduard Brücklmaier, was executed due to his connections to the plot of 20 July 1944.

After the Second World War the Corps was refounded on 13 July 1947, in 1963 the Alumnus bought a new house for the students in the district of Bogenhausen, this house was renovated and extended multiple times. In honour of the 200th Anniversary a Commercium in the Hofbräukeller and a ball in the Hotel "Bayrischer Hof".

Today the Corps has over 230 members, of which approximately 20 study. Every student has to live at least 3 to 4 semesters in the house of the fraternity before being dismissed as an Alumnus.

One particularity is, that most German fraternities – like Bavaria Munich – postulate live long membership. Those who finish their studies and even live in another city or country, still visit their "brothers“ periodically for special events or just pay a visit to the house spontaneously.

Famous members 
Look up famous members of the Corps Bavaria Munich here.

Short excerpt (alphabetically):

 Joseph Earl of Armansperg (1787–1853), Founder, Bavarian Minister, Chancellor of Greece
 Josef Knight of Aschenbrenner (1798–1858), Minister of Finance of Bavaria
 Gustav Baermann (1877–1950), Medic (Larvenauswanderungsverfahren)
 Theodor Imperial Earl Basselet of la Rosée (1801–1864), General, Royal Educator
 Eduard Brücklmeier (1903–1944), Lawyer, killed by Nazi Gouvernment
 Stefan Blum (*1957), Lawyer, Entrepreneur
 Richard Anton Nikolaus Carron du Val (1793–1846), Lawyer, Mayor of Augsburg
 Georg Cornet (1858–1915), Medic
 Ernst Derra (1901–1979), Medic
 Bodo Eidenmüller (*1927), Chief of Production with Siemens
 Horst Eidenmüller (*1963), Lecturer in Oxford, renunciation of membership
 Karsten Ewert (*1937), Medic, General of the Bundeswehr
 Ambroise Forssman-Trevedy (*1963), CEO of Wasgau Inc.
 Ignaz Baron Freyschlag of Freyenstein (1827–1891), General
 Ernst Frickhinger (1876–1940), Medic
 Joseph Gangkofner (1804–1862), Member of the parliament
 Heinrich Gattineau (1905–1985), Director at I.G. Farben, board member of WASAG-Chemie AG
 Karl Gebhardt (1897–1948), Medic, General of the SS
 Eugen Baron of Gorup-Besánez (1817–1878), Chemist
 Max Haushofer (1811-1866), painter, Professor, grandfather of Karl Haushofer
 Franz Hayler (1900-1972), Secretary of State 
 Gerd Hohlbach (*1944), Medic, Professor
 Lutz Jani (1935–2019), Medic, Professor
 Friedrich Jungheinrich (1899–1968), Founder of Jungheinrich
 Kajetan Georg von Kaiser (1803-1871), chemistry professor, researcher and inventor
 Ernst Mantel (1897–1971), Judge
 Karl Mantel (1869–1929), Chief of Police in Munich
 Theodor Mantel (*1942), Medic, Professor
 Carl Joseph Anton Mittermaier (1787–1867), President of the Universities of Landshut and Heidelberg
 Ernst-Günther Mohr (1904–1991), Ambassador
 Ignaz Perner (1796–1867), Lawyer
 Johann Michael Knight of Poschinger (1794–1863), Member of Parliament
 Anton Knight of Schauß (1800–1876), Lawyer, Member of Parliament
 Emil Knight of Schauß (1833–1900), Treasurer of the Royal Family
 Karl Tempel (1904–1940), 2nd Mayor of Munich
 Anton Westermayer (1816–1894), Member of the Parliament, Priest

References 

Student societies in Germany